Hulin is a county-level city on the Muling River in southeastern Heilongjiang province, People's Republic of China. With a population of around 200,000, it is under the administration of Jixi. Nearby are Lake Xingkai,  to the southwest, the Usuri River, which forms the Russian border  to the east. The main agricultural products include soybeans, cattle, milk, various organic produces, and lumber.

Geography and climate

Hulin has a monsoon-influenced humid continental climate (Köppen Dwb), with long, bitterly cold, but dry winters, and warm, humid summers. More than 2/3 of the year's precipitation occurs from June to September.

Administrative divisions 
Hulin City is divided into 7 towns and 4 townships. 
7 towns
 Hulin, Dongfanghong, Yingchun, Hutou, Yanggang, Dongcheng, Baodong
4 townships
 Xinyue, Weiguang, Zhenbaodao, Abei

References

Cities in Heilongjiang